"Du hast" is a song by German Neue Deutsche Härte band Rammstein. It was released as the second single from their second album Sehnsucht (1997). It has appeared on numerous soundtracks for films, most notably The Matrix: Music from the Motion Picture, How High, and the home video CKY2K.  It is featured in the music video games Guitar Hero 5 and Rock Band 3. The song's title is a play on the homophones du hasst ("you hate") and du hast ("you have").

Overview
There are two versions of the song: the original version completely in German, and a second version partially in English (found on special editions of the Sehnsucht album). In the second version, the first chorus and the verses are in English and the last chorus is in German. The English lyrics are not a direct translation of the German; the original lyrics take advantage of a pair of German homophones: when conjugated in the second person singular form (i.e. "you"), the verbs haben (to have) and hassen (to hate) become respectively du hast and du hasst, which sound identical. The guitar riff is similar to Ministry's "Just One Fix".

Live performances
The first known performance of the song dates from 9 April 1997 in Amsterdam, Netherlands. Over the years, several stunts have been used during the live performances of "Du hast", ranging from the dildo used in "Bück dich", to the bow used in "Du riechst so gut". In their Reise, Reise and Liebe ist für alle da tour, flames shoot several feet into the air and Till Lindemann fired with a different bow into the air, "starting" a chain reaction that fired rockets over the audience. Being a fan favourite, it has been played in almost every concert to date since its initial performance. When performed live, the intro is always a bit longer than in the studio version.

The song has been covered by Motionless in White for Punk Goes 90s Vol. 2 in 2014 and Lizzo while performing in Germany in 2023.

Music video
The music video for the song was directed by Philipp Stölzl, and was summed up by one review as "crime, masks, love, violence, betrayal, fire and booze". It begins with Rammstein drummer Christoph Schneider pulling up outside an isolated building in a car with a woman played by German actress , whom Schneider kisses and embraces. The video then cuts to masked men aggressively singing towards the camera, before cutting back and forth between this and Schneider taking a handgun out of a bag in the car and tucking it into his belt as he enters the building. Inside, he sees the masked men lined up behind a chair. They remove their masks to reveal that they are the other members of the band, and a relieved Schneider releases his grip from the gun and embraces them, drinking and celebrating with them. All the while, the woman waits nervously outside, first in the car, and then pacing outside of it, then sitting on the ground beside it smoking a cigarette, as dusk falls. More imagery from inside the building appears to show the band members attacking someone, injecting something with a syringe, and a man walking while on fire. The video ends with Schneider and the rest of the band walking out of the building and past the car, with Schneider glancing at the woman leaning against it and checking his watch before the car blows up, apparently killing the woman.

Track listing

Charts

Weekly charts

Year-end charts

Certifications

Covers 

 In 2014, American metal band Motionless in White covered the song for their album Punk Goes 90's. Vol. 2.
 In 2015 Russian Klezmer band Dobranotch covered the song with the lyrics translated into Yiddish
 In 2023, French neofolk band SKÁLD covered the song for their album Huldufólk.

References

1997 singles
London Records singles
nu metal songs
Rammstein songs
Slash Records singles
songs written by Christian Lorenz
songs written by Christoph Schneider
songs written by Oliver Riedel
songs written by Paul Landers
songs written by Richard Z. Kruspe
songs written by Till Lindemann